Jiangning Sports Centre Stadium is a football stadium in Nanjing, China.  It hosted the China League One side, Nanjing Yoyo F.C. until 2011, when the club was dissolved.  The stadium holds 28,000 spectators.

References

External links
 Jiangning Sports Centre, chinadaily.com,  2014-08-11
Stadium information (not accessible) version at Web.archive.org, dated 6 March 2012 

Football venues in Nanjing
Sports venues in Nanjing
Venues of the 2014 Summer Youth Olympics
Youth Olympic football venues